Eduard Franck (5 October 1817 – 1 December 1893) was a German composer, pianist and music pedagogue.

Life 
Franck was born in Breslau, the capital of the Prussian province of Silesia. He was the fourth child of a wealthy banker who exposed his children to Germany's cultural figures. Frequenters of the Franck home included Heine, Humboldt, Heller, Mendelssohn, and Wagner. His family's financial position allowed Franck to study with Felix Mendelssohn as a private student in Düsseldorf and later in Leipzig. As a talented pianist, he embarked upon a dual career as a concert artist and teacher for more than four decades during the course of which he held many positions.

Although he was highly regarded as both a teacher and performer, he never achieved the public recognition of his better known contemporaries such as Mendelssohn, Schumann or Liszt. Despite being compared favourably to them, the fact that he failed to publish very many of his compositions until toward the end of his life, in part, explains why he was not better known. Said to be a perfectionist, he continually delayed releasing his works until they were polished to his demanding standards. Schumann, among others, thought quite highly of the few works he did publish during the first part of his life.

He was the father of Richard Franck.

Music
His chamber music is generally considered amongst his finest compositions. Of the works with opus numbers, there are 3 string quartets, 2 string quintets for 2 violins, 2 violas and cello, 2 string sextets, 4 piano trios, a piano quintet, 2 sonatas for cello & piano, and 4 sonatas for violin and piano. In addition to these, there are several other works without opus, including a piano sextet, 2 piano trios, a piano quintet, a sonata for violin & piano and an occasional piece for cello & piano.

List of chamber music works with opus number
Op.6: Sonata for Violoncello & Piano in D Major, 2012 critical Urtext-Edition by Pfefferkorn Music Publishers (Leipzig)
Op.11: Piano Trio No.1 in E minor
Op.15: String Quintet in E minor (2 Vln, 2 Vla & Vc)
Op.19: No.1: Sonata for Violin & Piano in C minor,  2011 critical Urtext-Edition by Pfefferkorn Music Publishers (Leipzig)
Op.22: Piano Trio No.2 in E Flat Major
Op.23: No.2: Sonata for Violin & Piano in A Major,  2011 critical Urtext-Edition by Pfefferkorn Music Publishers (Leipzig)
Op.41: String Sextet No.1 in E Flat Major, 2011 critical Urtext-Edition by Pfefferkorn Music Publishers (Leipzig)
Op.42: Sonata for Violoncello & Piano in F Major
Op.45: Piano Quintet in D Major
Op.49: String Quartet No.1 in F minor (also known as Op.40)
Op.50: String Sextet No.2 in D Major, 2011 critical Urtext-Edition by Pfefferkorn Music Publishers (Leipzig)
Op.51: String Quintet No.2 in C Major (2 Vln, 2 Vla & Vc)
Op.53: Piano Trio No.3 in E Flat Major [The German National Library and Audite site list this work as being in D major, while IMSLP says E♭ major.]
Op.54: String Quartet No.2 in E Flat Major
Op.55: String Quartet No.3 in C minor
Op.58: Piano Trio No.4 in D Major
Op.60: Sonata for Violin & Piano in E Major,  2011 critical Urtext-Edition by Pfefferkorn Music Publishers (Leipzig)
 Op. posth. Sonata for Violin & Piano in D Major,  2012 critical Urtext-Edition by Pfefferkorn Music Publishers (Leipzig)

Orchestral works (partial list)
Op.12: Concert-overture in E (1848)
Op.13: Piano Concerto in D minor (1850); Critical Urtext-Edition edited by James Tocco, 2012 by Pfefferkorn Music Publishers, Leipzig
Op.30: Violin Concerto in E minor (1855)
Op.47: Symphony in A (1860?)
Op.52: Symphony in B (1856)
Op.57: Violin Concerto in D (1860)
Without opus?: Piano Concerto No.2 in C? (1879) (manuscript)

References

Altmann, Wilhelm: Handbuch fur Streichquartettspieler, Vol.3, Heinrichshofen Verlag, Wilhelmshafen,1972
Cobbett's Cyclopedic Survey of Chamber Music, Vol.1, 2nd Edition, Oxford Univ. Press, London, 1963
Feuchte, Paul and Andreas: Die Komponisten Eduard Franck und Richard Franck, Leben und Werk, Dokumente, Quellen, Second Edition, Leipzig 2010
Some of the information on this page appears on the website of Edition Silvertrust but permission has been granted to copy, distribute and/or modify this document under the terms of the GNU Free Documentation License.

External links

Website of Pfefferkorn Music Publishers, Leipzig
Eduard Franck String Sextet Nos.1 & 2, String Quartet Nos. 2 & 3 and Piano Quintet Op.45 Soundbites & short biography.
http://www.klassika.info/Komponisten/Franck/index.html
http://www.audite.de

German Romantic composers
Berlin University of the Arts alumni
1817 births
1893 deaths
19th-century classical composers
German male classical composers
19th-century German composers
19th-century German male musicians